The Kroger 200 was a race for the NASCAR Xfinity Series (formerly known as the Nationwide Series) which took place at Lucas Oil Raceway at Indianapolis in Clermont, Indiana.

It originally debuted as a summer night race, and was the only major NASCAR event in the state of Indiana. In previous years, USAC stock car races were held at the facility, although the two events were not associated.

In 1994, the Kroger 200 was moved to the night before the Winston Cup Series' Brickyard 400 at the nearby Indianapolis Motor Speedway. It appropriately began serving as an unofficial support race for larger Speedway's event. From 1994 to 2000, it was held on Friday night. Beginning in 2001, when the Brickyard 400 moved to Sundays, this race was held on Saturday night.

From 1995 to 2011, the race was held as a doubleheader weekend with the Truck Series AAA Insurance 200.

The race was sponsored by Kroger during its entire existence from 1982 to 2011.

In 2011, the race was held for the last time in the foreseeable future. Starting in 2012, the Nationwide Series moved to the Indianapolis Motor Speedway for the Indiana 250. An ARCA race took its place.

Race results

2005, 2010, & 2011: Race extended due to a Green-white-checker finish.
2007: First win for Toyota.

USAC Stock Car race

1961 – Don White
1961 – Len Sutton
1961 – Norm Nelson
1962 – Norm Nelson
1963 – A. J. Foyt
1963 – A. J. Foyt
1964 – Fred Lorenzen
1965 – Norm Nelson
1965 – Paul Goldsmith
1966 – Norm Nelson
1967 – Parnelli Jones
1968 – A. J. Foyt
1969 – Parnelli Jones
1970 – A. J. Foyt
1971 – Dave Whitcomb
1972 – Roger McCluskey
1980 – Joe Ruttman
1982 – Scott Stovall

References

External links
 

Former NASCAR races
NASCAR Xfinity Series races
 
Recurring sporting events established in 1982
Recurring sporting events disestablished in 2011
1982 establishments in Indiana
2011 disestablishments in Indiana